Partidul Democrat may refer to:

Democratic Party (Romania)
Democratic Party of Moldova